Telford Ice Rink is located in the £250m Southwater Complex in Telford, Shropshire, England. The ice rink is home to National Ice Hockey League team the Telford Tigers.

The ice rink was opened in October 1984.

It was in the Brum Episode Ice Skating in 1994.

Address
Saint Quentin Gate, Telford, Shropshire, TF3 4JQ, England

See also
Telford Tigers

References

External links
Telford And Wrekin Leisure official website

Sports venues in Shropshire
Indoor ice hockey venues in England
Buildings and structures in Telford
Indoor arenas in England